Christopher Allen Thomas Cummings (born August 11, 1975) is a Canadian country music artist. In his career, he has released five studio albums, one compilation album, and one extended play. Several of his singles have charted on the Canadian country charts, including the Number One hits "Sure Enough" and "The Kind of Heart That Breaks".

Biography
Chris Cummings began performing in 1980, at the age of five years. In 1990, Chris released an independent CD, which found its way to Reprise Records president Jim Ed Norman, who signed him on in 1992. At age 17, he was the youngest artist they had ever signed.

His first single, "I Waited," was released in Canada in the fall of 1995, and shot into the top 5. Produced by Jim Ed Norman and Rick Scott, Chris released his debut CD, Somewhere Inside, on June 18, 1996. The second single, "Sure Enough," went straight to No. 1. Follow-up songs "Somewhere Inside" and "Almost Always" also reached the top 5 in Canada reaching No. 3 and No. 4 respectively, and the album was certified gold.

Chris' second CD, Chris Cummings, was released in both the United States and Canada on February 24, 1998. Since 7 of the songs were already on Chris' Canadian debut, Reprise released an EP in Canada (The Kind Of Heart That Breaks) in 1997 containing the 3 new songs, along with "Lonesomeville" and an acoustic version of "Somewhere Inside." The first single released from the project was "The Kind of Heart That Breaks." While the song went to No. 1 in Canada, it stalled at No. 50 on Billboard in the U.S. The American follow-up single, "I Waited," failed to chart. Meanwhile, Chris returned to the Canadian top 10 with "A Minute And A Half."

Chris was transferred to WEA Canada for the release of his third CD, Lonesomeville. The disc was released on February 15, 2000. The first two singles, "That'll Teach Her" reached No. 4 on the charts with the second single "No One Hurts Me More Than Me," reached No. 7 in Canada.  The final single, "A Little At A Time" entered the top 20 charts landing at No. 19.

Chris released his fourth CD, Ooh, That Could Cost Him the Gold, Bob! on March 26, 2002. He continued his string of hits in Canada with songs like "Cowboy Hats," "Betty," and "Benefit Of Doubt."

Chris' Greatest Hits package was released on April 27, 2004. Singles released from the album included "Lucy Got Lucky" and "Not Again." Chris left Warner at the end of 2004 for more control over his career.

Chris signed with Koch Entertainment in 2006. Chris' first album for Koch, Who Says You Can't?, was released on October 17. Chris had a hand in producing the album, which brought him back to the Canadian top 30 with the songs "Dixie Beauxderaunt," "For The Music," "Love Is Fine," "In The Nicest Way," and the last single, "Hey What You Know" released in July 2008.

Returning to his home Province of New Brunswick in mid-2007 after being gone since the age of 17 living in California, Tennessee, Ontario and Alberta, he took on a special project. Chris partnered with a local organization to record the John Sebastian hit "Welcome Back", a song that Cummings saw as a perfect "anthem" for the city and entire Province of New Brunswick.  In addition, he decided to shoot the video for it in the city of Saint John the communities that surround it. In the summer of 2008 he was named an "Ambassador for the Province of New Brunswick" by Premier, Shawn Graham.

Chris signed with Royalty Records in April 2010 for his newest CD entitled Give Me Tonight The first single "Heart Like A Stone" was released online and to Canadian country radio on May 17, 2010, and the CD was released on September 21, 2010.  Released at the same time as the new CD, the follow up single "Leavings Not An Option" had special meaning for Chris as he co-wrote it with one of his long-time songwriting mentors Don Schlitz (one of three Schlitz co-writes on the new CD), the single was well received at radio returning Chris to the forefront of the Canadian country music scene.

Discography

Studio albums

Compilation albums

Extended plays

Singles

Music videos

Notes

References

CMT.com
Opry North
American Federation of Musicians

External links
Chris Cummings Official

Canadian male singer-songwriters
Canadian country singer-songwriters
People from Kings County, New Brunswick
1975 births
Living people
21st-century Canadian male singers
Reprise Records artists
Musicians from New Brunswick